Per Holm Knudsen (born 18 December 1945 in Copenhagen) is a Danish writer, teacher and psychotherapist. He is the author of The True Story of How Babies Are Made, a detailed and colorfully illustrated children's book that chronicles love, marriage, conception, pre-natal growth, and birth.  As the title promises, it explains the biological process of human reproduction, using correct terminology and graphic pictures.

Bibliography

Illustrated children's books 
 Den lille blå bil (Borgen, 1969)
 Palmen Joachim (Borgen, 1970)
 Sæbeboble grøn og sæbeboble rød (Borgen, 1970)
 Ballonen Bubi (Borgen, 1970)
 Sådan får man et barn (Borgen, 1971)
The True Story of How Babies are Made was published in 1973 by Children's Press of Chicago, Illinois.
How a Baby is Made (SBN 85166-420-2) was published in 1973 by Franklin Watts Limited of London, Great Britain.
 Da solen stod op om natten (Borgen, 1971)
 Frøen Jakob (Borgen, 1972)
 Rødspætten Katinka (Borgen, 1972)
 Musen Malle (Borgen, 1973)
 En muldvarp (Borgen, 1982)

Youth novels 
 Conny og bolighajen (Borgen, 1974)

Short stories 
 Børnelokkeren (1979) in the anthology Med egne øjne og andre noveller, Borgen
 Og så kan man ikke blive soldat (1979) in the anthology Dumme tøser, Jespersen og Pios forlag
 Krig i København (1980) in the anthology Billeder fra 60'erne, Delta (Publishing house) – new improved edition, Branner & Koch (2004)
 Den første kamp (1980) in the anthology I dag, Oktober
 Langt ude ... i skoven (1982) in the anthology Malurt, Tellerup

Translations 
 Sven Wernström: Fjendens sprog (1975), Forlaget GMT
 Sven Wernström: Om at skrive som håndværk (1979), Høst og Søn
 Ulf Nilsson: En kamp for livet (1982), Høst og Søn

Prizes 
Ministry of Culture's children book prize (Denmark) (Kulturministeriets Børnebogspris)

External links 

  (Danish)
His biography (on the writers private website) (Danish)

Danish male writers
Living people
1945 births
People from Copenhagen
Danish children's writers